Roman Hatashita (born 22 August 1965) is a Canadian judoka and entrepreneur who represented Canada at the 1992 Olympics in the -71 kg category. Since 1998, he has owned and operated Hatashita International, a martial arts supply company founded by his uncle Frank Hatashita in 1947.

See also
Judo in Canada
List of Canadian judoka

References

1965 births
Living people
Canadian male judoka
Olympic judoka of Canada
Judoka at the 1992 Summer Olympics
Sportspeople from Kitchener, Ontario